Tungurahua (literally Province of the Tungurahua) is one of the twenty-four provinces of Ecuador. Its capital is Ambato. The province takes its name from the Tungurahua volcano, which is located within the boundaries of the provinces.

Population
In 2011, Tungurahua had an estimated population of 581,389. Approximately 10% of that population is made up of indigenous peoples, while another 70% are of mestizo or mixed race heritage. The final 20% is made up of peoples of African, Asian, and European ancestry.

Climate
The province has a dry, temperate climate. Like all mountainous areas, the region experiences the phenomenon known as microclimates, in which small portions of the province have drastically different conditions from others due to winds and area pressure.

Generally though, Tungurahua experiences temperatures between 14 and 17 degree Celsius in the day-time, with cooler nights. At higher altitudes, conditions are much colder. Despite the area being near the Equator, mountains such as Carihuayrazo and Chimborazo are covered in snow for much of the year.

Geography
The province is very mountainous, containing the Tungurahua volcano near Baños, as well as bordering the Carihuayrazo and Chimborazo volcanoes to the south. Baños attracts the highest number of tourists. The principal river of the province is the Patate River, which flows to the east toward the Amazon Region.

Political division 
The province is divided into nine cantons which stretch from Ambato in the west to Baños in the east. The following table lists each with its population at the 2001 census, its area in square kilometres (km2), and the name of the canton seat or capital.

Places of interest 
 Parque de la Familia
 Llanganates National Park

See also 
 Provinces of Ecuador
 Cantons of Ecuador
 Pelileo
 Píllaro

References

External links

 
Provinces of Ecuador